Fast & Furious (also known as Fast & Furious 4) is a 2009 action film directed by Justin Lin and written by Chris Morgan. It serves as the direct sequel to The Fast and the Furious (2001) and 2 Fast 2 Furious (2003) and the fourth main installment in the Fast & Furious franchise. It stars Vin Diesel, Paul Walker, Michelle Rodriguez, Jordana Brewster, John Ortiz, and Laz Alonso. In the film, Dominic Toretto (Diesel) and Brian O'Conner (Walker) must team up to apprehend drug lord Arturo Braga (Ortiz).

A fourth film was announced in July 2007, with the returns of Diesel, Walker, Rodriguez, and Brewster confirmed shortly thereafter. To account for the original cast seeing absences from either of the previous two installments, the film was developed to retcon The Fast and the Furious: Tokyo Drift (2006) as occurring beyond the events of Fast & Furious, while the short film Los Bandoleros (2009) was produced and released. Principal photography began in February 2008 and concluded that July, with filming locations including Los Angeles and the Dominican Republic. Lin, Morgan, and composer Brian Tyler returned in their roles from Tokyo Drift. Fast & Furious is the first film to feature D-BOX motion.

Fast & Furious was scheduled to be released in June 2009, but premiered at the Gibson Amphitheatre in Los Angeles on March 12, 2009, and was theatrically released worldwide on April 3, by Universal Pictures. The film received mixed reviews from critics, with praise for reuniting the original cast and the action sequences, but criticism for its screenplay. It grossed over $360 million worldwide, exceeding expectations to become the then-highest-grossing film in the franchise. It also grossed $72.5 million worldwide during its opening weekend, which made it the highest grossing worldwide spring weekend opening of all-time, until the release of Alice in Wonderland (2010). A sequel, Fast Five, was released in April 2011.

Plot

Still on the run from the law, Dominic Toretto and his crew, consisting of girlfriend Letty, Tego Leo, Rico Santos, Cara and Han Lue, are hijacking fuel tankers in the Dominican Republic. After their latest heist, Han informs Dom that the police are on their trail, making him decide to disband the crew and leave Letty behind to protect them all from being caught. Months later, in Panama City, Dom gets a call from his sister Mia, who tells him Letty has been killed in a car crash. Dom heads to Los Angeles to attend her funeral and finds traces of nitromethane at the crash site. He coerces the local mechanic into giving the name of the buyer, David Park, and is informed that the only car that uses nitromethane in the area is a green 1972 Ford Torino Sport. Meanwhile, FBI agent Brian O'Conner is trying to track down a Mexican drug lord, Arturo Braga, whose identity to the public is unknown; his search also leads him to Park.

Dom arrives at Park's apartment and hangs him out of the window by his ankles before Brian arrives. Brian saves Park, who in turn becomes the FBI's new informant and gets Brian into a street race. Brian selects a modified 2002 Nissan Skyline GT-R R34 from the impound lot; Dom also shows up, in his 1970 Chevrolet Chevelle SS. Ramon Campos, Braga's second-in-command, and Gisele Yashar, Braga's liaison, reveal that the winner will become the last driver on a team that traffics heroin between the Mexico–United States border. Dom wins by bumping Brian's car while in nitro, making him lose control. Brian uses his power as an FBI agent to arrest another driver, Dwight Mueller, and takes his place on the team. The team meets up with Braga's henchman, Fenix, and Dom notices that Fenix drives the same Torino the mechanic described.

They drive across the border using tunnels to avoid detection. Dom confronts Fenix and learns that he kills the drivers after their work is done, and that he killed Letty when she tried to escape him. A stand-off ensues; Dominic detonates his car with nitrous to distract Braga's men, and Brian hijacks a 1999 Hummer H1 with $60 million worth of heroin in it. Brian and Dom drive back to LA and hide the heroin in a police impound lot, where they pick up a modified 2008 Subaru Impreza WRX STI hatchback; they drive to Dom's house and reunite with Mia. Dom attacks Brian when he learns he was the last person in contact with Letty; Brian explains Letty was working undercover, tracking Braga in exchange for clearing Dominic's record. Brian tells his superiors that in exchange for Dominic's pardon, he will lure Braga into a trap, forcing him to show up to exchange money for the heroin. At the drop site, the man who claims to be Braga is revealed as a decoy, and Campos—the real Braga—escapes with Fenix to Mexico. In the ensuing chaos, Fenix nearly runs over Gisele before Dom saves her. The failed trap results in Brian being taken off active duty.

With Gisele's help, Brian and Dom travel to Mexico to catch Braga in the Subaru and Dom's rebuilt 1970 Dodge Charger R/T, and apprehend him at a church. As Braga's henchmen try to rescue him, Brian and Dom drive through the tunnels back to the United States. Brian is chased by Fenix ahead of the others until he is T-boned and pushed out of the tunnels. Before Fenix can kill him, Dom drives out of the tunnels and into Fenix, killing him. As police and helicopters approach the crash site on the American side of the border, Brian tells Dom to leave, but Dom says he is tired of running. Despite Brian's request for clemency, the judge sentences Dom to 25 years to life. Brian resigns from the FBI and Dom boards a prison bus that will transport him to Lompoc penitentiary. As the bus drives down the road, Brian, Mia, Leo, and Santos arrive in their cars to intercept it.

Cast

 Vin Diesel as Dominic Toretto: A professional street racer, criminal, and fugitive.
 Paul Walker as Brian O'Conner: An FBI agent and former LAPD police officer who previously aided Dom in avoiding law enforcement, and was in a relationship with Mia Toretto, which later got patched up again.
 Michelle Rodriguez as Letty Ortiz: Dominic's wife, who dies in an automobile explosion caused by Fenix Calderon.
 Jordana Brewster as Mia Toretto: Dominic's sister and Brian's ex-girlfriend, but the relationship was later patched up again.
 John Ortiz as Arturo Braga / Ramon Campos: A Mexican drug lord who recruits street racers to smuggle heroin across the Mexico–U.S. border.
 Gal Gadot as Gisele Yashar: A liaison for Braga who shows a romantic interest in Dom.
 Laz Alonso as Fenix Calderon: Braga's right-hand man.

The central cast is rounded out by Sung Kang as Han Lue,  Ron Yuan as David Park, Braga's right-hand man, while Puerto Rican singers Tego Calderón and Don Omar feature as Leo and Santos respectively, members of the oil heist team. Shea Whigham plays Brian's snarky colleague Michael Stasiak, and Liza Lapira portrays Sophie Trinh, an FBI agent who works closely with Brian. Jack Conley features as Penning, Brian's boss, a scout of street racers for Braga. Greg Cipes, Neil Brown Jr., and Brandon T. Jackson play Dwight Mueller, Malik Herzon, and Alex, respectively, the other members of Braga's street racing team.

Production

Development
After positive reception from audiences to Vin Diesel's cameo in Tokyo Drift, Universal was confident in effectively rebooting the series with its original stars. The film was announced in July 2007, with Diesel, Paul Walker, and several other cast members of the original film reprising their roles.

Filming
Filming began in 2008. The movie cars were built in Southern California's San Fernando Valley. Around 240 cars were built for the film. However, the replica vehicles do not match the specifications they were supposed to represent. For example, the replica version of F-Bomb, a 1973 Chevrolet Camaro built by Tom Nelson of NRE and David Freiburger of Hot Rod magazine, included a 300 hp crate V8 engine with a 3-speed automatic transmission, whereas the actual car included a twin-turbo 1,500 hp engine and a 5-speed transmission.

The original Dodge Charger 426 Hemi R/T that was used in the original movie was a 1970, but the car in this movie was a 1969 Dodge Charger R/T 426 Hemi with a slightly modified front grill and rear tail lights to appear as a 1970 car; the original 1970 Dodge Charger was in pieces, being totally disassembled for restoration.

The original red 1970 Chevrolet Chevelle SS seen in the end credits of the first Fast & Furious movie, also makes an appearance but is later highly modified for a street race.

The most radical vehicles built for the film were the Chevy trucks constructed for the fuel heist. Powered by 502ci GM big block motors, the '67 had a giant ladder-bar suspension with airbags using a massive 10-ton semi rear axle with the biggest and widest truck tires they could find. The '88 Chevy Crew Cab was built with twin full-floating GM 1-ton axles equipped with Detroit Lockers and a transfer case directing power to both axles and capable of four-wheel burnouts.

Another vehicle built for the film was the blue Nissan Skyline GT-R R34 owned by an uncredited owner which brought a 241-mile per hour top speed at the Bayshore Route Highway in Japan. It was a hard car to build by the production so they made clones by acquiring Nissan Skyline 25GT's and made them look like the original car. The Skyline 
that was also used at the desert was actually a dune buggy using a Skyline R34's shell.

Music

The score to Fast & Furious was composed by Brian Tyler, who recorded his score with the Hollywood Studio Symphony at the Newman Scoring Stage at 20th Century Fox. The score album was released on CD by Varèse Sarabande Records with over 78 minutes' worth of music.

The trailers for the film feature the track "We Are Rockstars" by Does It Offend You, Yeah? and a Travis Barker-remixed version of "Crank That" by Soulja Boy Tell 'Em.

The official soundtrack was released on March 31, 2009, on Star Trak, with production handled primarily by The Neptunes. Singles include "Blanco" and "Krazy" by Pitbull and "Bad Girls" by Robin Thicke. The soundtrack also features the song "G-Stro" by Busta Rhymes featuring Pharrell Williams, a leftover track from Busta Rhymes' album Back on My B.S. Star Trak and Interscope Records released the soundtrack for the film with "Crank That" not included. Another song omitted was "Rising Sun" by South Korean group TVXQ.

The Japanese version of the movie features the song "Before I Decay" by Japanese rock group The GazettE.

Release

Theatrical
It was originally set to release on June 12, 2009, but moved it up to April 3, 2009, instead. It was the first motion-enhanced theatrical film to feature D-BOX motion feedback technology in selected theaters.

Home media
Fast & Furious was released on DVD and Blu-ray on July 28, 2009. The DVD is a two-disc set that includes:
 Digital copy of the film
 Under the Hood: Muscle Cars & Imports
 High Octane Action: The Stunts
 Shooting the Big Rig Heist
 Driving School with Vin Diesel
 Original short film Los Bandoleros, the never-before-seen short film that reveals the events leading up to the explosive beginning of Fast & Furious. It is written and directed by Vin Diesel and was produced in the Dominican Republic. This was released on the iTunes Store as a free download.

, the DVD and Blu-ray sales have sold 4,616,164 copies generating $77,846,318 in sales revenue. It was re-released in Australia on Blu-ray including a digital copy and re-titled Fast & Furious 4 on March 30, 2011.

Reception

Box office
On its first day of release Fast & Furious grossed $30.6 million, and peaked at the top spot of the weekend box office with $72.5 million, more than Tokyo Drift earned in its entire domestic run. The film had the sixth-biggest opening weekend of 2009 and was double what most industry observers expected. Additionally, it surpassed The Lost World: Jurassic Parks record for having the largest opening weekend for any Universal film.

It also held the record for the highest-grossing opening weekend in April and of any car-oriented film, the record having been previously held by Cars, which grossed $60.1 million. Both of these records were broken two years later by Fast Five, which grossed $86.2 million. Fast & Furious also held the record for the highest opening weekend for a spring release, until it was broken by Tim Burton's Alice in Wonderland. Its worldwide gross on its opening weekend stands at $102.6 million with $7.2 million coming from the UK, $8.6 million from Russia, $6 million in France and $3 million from Germany.

The film ended its theatrical release on July 2, 2009, with a gross of $155.1 million in the United States and Canada, and $205.3 million internationally, for a worldwide total of $360.4 million, making it the 17th highest-grossing film of 2009.

Critical response

On Rotten Tomatoes, Fast & Furious holds an approval rating of 28% based on 177 reviews, with an average rating of 4.6/10. The site's critics consensus reads: "While Fast and Furious features the requisite action and stunts, the filmmakers have failed to provide a competent story or compelling characters." On Metacritic, the film has a weighted average score of 46 out of 100 based on 28 critics, indicating "mixed or average reviews". Audiences polled by CinemaScore gave the film an average grade of "A−" on an A+ to F scale.

Lisa Schwarzbaum of Entertainment Weekly gave the film a B+ and wrote, "Fast & Furious is still no Point Break. But it's perfectly aware of its limited dramatic mission ... it offers an attractive getaway route from self-importance, snark, and chatty comedies about male bonding." Writing for The Hollywood Reporter, Kirk Honeycutt called it "the first true sequel of the bunch. By reuniting the two male stars from the original and ... continuing the story from the first film, this new film should re-ignite the franchise." Betsy Sharkey of the Los Angeles Times considered it a "strange piece of nostalgia, where, without apology, fast cars still rule and fuel is burned with abandon." Roger Ebert, who had given positive reviews to the previous films, considered the story, dialogue, and acting to all be perfunctory: "I admire the craft involved, but the movie leaves me profoundly indifferent. After three earlier movies in the series, which have been transmuted into video games, why do we need a fourth one? Oh. I just answered my own question."

Accolades

Sequel

Vin Diesel and Paul Walker reunited for a Fast & Furious sequel, entitled Fast Five. Justin Lin directed, while Chris Morgan wrote the screenplay. It was released in April 2011.

References

External links

 
 

2009 films
2000s action adventure films
2009 action thriller films
2000s chase films
2009 crime thriller films
2000s heist films
2000s road movies
American action thriller films
American chase films
American heist films
American road movies
American sequel films
D-Box motion-enhanced films
2000s English-language films
Fast & Furious films
Films about the Federal Bureau of Investigation
Films about automobiles
Films about Mexican drug cartels
American films about revenge
Films directed by Justin Lin
Films produced by Neal H. Moritz
Films scored by Brian Tyler
Films set in the Dominican Republic
Films set in Japan
Films set in Los Angeles
Films set in Mexico
Films set in Panama
Films shot in Los Angeles
One Race Films films
Original Film films
Relativity Media films
Universal Pictures films
Films with screenplays by Chris Morgan
Films set in Koreatown, Los Angeles
2000s American films
2000s Mexican films